Sibul is an Estonian language family name. The word literally means "onion". Sibul is also an Estonian ethnic slur for Russians.

The surname may refer to:

Riho Sibul (born 1958), Estonian musician
Leon Sibul, Estonian-American professor
Lembit Sibul, Estonian humorist
Priit Sibul, Estonian politician

Estonian-language surnames